Coat of arms of Ossetia may refer to

Coat of Arms of the Republic of North Ossetia–Alania, a federal subject of Russia
Coat of arms of South Ossetia, a disputed region in the Caucasus